Scaevola eneabba is a species of flowering plant in the family Goodeniaceae. It is a small, spreading shrub with fan-shaped white to pink flowers and is endemic to Western Australia.

Description
Flowering occurs around December.

Taxonomy and naming
Scaevola eneabba was first formally described in 1990 by Roger Charles Carolin and the description was published in Telopea. The specific epithet (eneabba) refers to the type location.

Distribution and habitat
This scaevola grows in heath near Eneabba in Western Australia.

Conservation status
Scaevola eneabba is listed as "Priority Two" by the Western Australian Government Department of Biodiversity, Conservation and Attractions, meaning that it is poorly known and from only one or a few locations.

References

 

eneabba
Flora of Western Australia